Marshall Fletcher McCallie (born June 21, 1945) is a former United States Ambassador to Namibia.

Early life and education
McCallie was born in Chattanooga, Tennessee and attended the McCallie School. He earned his B.A. degree from Vanderbilt University in 1967, and his M.A. degree from the Fletcher School of Law and Diplomacy at Tufts University in 1974.

Career
McCallie served in the U.S. Air Force from 1967–1971. Later he served in various posts in the U.S. State Department, particularly in Africa. He was appointed United States Ambassador to Namibia by President George H. W. Bush in 1992 and he served in this position from 1993 – 1996.

Other diplomatic posts
1986 – 1988: Director of the Junior Officer Division with the Bureau of Personnel
1988 – 1990: Deputy Chief of Mission at the U.S. Embassy in Lusaka, Zambia

Personal life
McCallie retired in 2002 and resides in Brevard, North Carolina with his wife Amye.

References

External links

Ambassadors of the United States to Namibia
1945 births
Vanderbilt University alumni
The Fletcher School at Tufts University alumni
Living people
United States Foreign Service personnel
20th-century American diplomats